Kel Judd (born 21 April 1958) is a former Australian professional rugby league player. A prop, Judd played one match for the Eastern Suburbs during the 1979 NSWRFL season, and made a further six appearances for the club in 1983.

References

1958 births
Living people
Australian rugby league players
Sydney Roosters players
Rugby league props